Frederick William Chatburn (born 1878) was an English professional footballer who played as a winger.

References

1878 births
Footballers from Grimsby
English footballers
Association football wingers
Weelsby Alexandra F.C. players
Grimsby White Star F.C. players
Grimsby All Saints F.C. players
Grimsby Town F.C. players
Grimsby Rovers F.C. players
English Football League players
Year of death missing